MANE is a major producer of flavours and fragrances with sales of €1,5 billion 2021. MANE was placed 7th on FoodTalks' Global Top 50 Food Flavours and Fragrances Companies list in 2021.

History
MANE was founded in 1871 when Victor Mane started producing fragrant materials from regional flowers and plants. 

Victor Mane's sons Eugène and Gabriel took over the business and developed it internationally between 1916 and 1958. 

In 1959, Maurice Mane took over from his father Eugène and diversified into the growing flavorings market for the food industry. 

In 1995, Maurice Mane retired to become Chairman of the Monitoring Committee and his son Jean took over as President of the company. 

MANE is a member of the European Flavour Association.

References

External links
Official Website
Body Fragrance

Flavor companies
Fragrance companies
Food and drink companies of France
Companies based in Provence-Alpes-Côte d'Azur
Cosmetics companies of France